The 1988 Japan Series was the Nippon Professional Baseball (NPB) championship series for the 1988 season. It was the 39th Japan Series and featured the Central League champion Chunichi Dragons against the Pacific League champion Seibu Lions. Chunichi won the Central League pennant by a comfortable 12 games to advance to the championship. However, the representative from the Pacific League was undecided up until 3 days before Game 1 of the Japan Series. Seibu fought neck-and-neck for first place with the Kintetsu Buffaloes over most of the season and finished their regular-season schedule with a 0.5-game advantage over Kintetsu, with Kintetsu having 4 games left to play. On the last day of the season (October 19), Kintetsu had to win both games of an away double-header against the last-place Lotte Orions to claim the PL pennant. Kintetsu won the first game by one run (by scoring one run in the top of the ninth inning), but Lotte forced a comeback tie in the second game, capping a dramatic finish to the season (known to Japanese baseball fans as 10.19) and giving Seibu the PL spot in the Japan Series for the fourth year in a row.

Played at Nagoya Stadium and Seibu Dome, the Lions won the series four games to one, winning the final game on a walk-off base hit by catcher Tsutomu Ito. The 1988 contest was the third in Japan Series history to end on a walk-off (after 1950 and 1965). Seibu shortstop Hiromichi Ishige was named Most Valuable Player of the series. The series was played between October 22 and October 27 with home field advantage going to the Central League.

Summary

Matchups

Game 1

Game 2

Game 3

Game 4

Game 5

See also
1988 World Series

References

External links
 Nippon Professional Baseball—Official website (in English)

Japan Series
Japan Series
Japan Series
Seibu Lions
Chunichi Dragons